Kunda (Chikunda) is a Bantu language of Zimbabwe, with a some thousands of speakers in Zambia and Mozambique.

There is an extinct pidgin Chikunda once used for trade.

References

Further reading
Zemba, Mercy (2015). "A grammatical sketch of Kunda Language". University of Zambia MA dissertation. (Description.)

Languages of Zambia
Languages of Mozambique
Languages of Zimbabwe
Nyasa languages